Richilde or Richilda may refer to:

 Richilde of Provence (ca. 845–910)
 Richilde, Countess of Hainaut (ca. 1031–1086)
 Richeza of Poland, Queen of Castile (ca. 1140 – 1185)
 Richilde (fairy tale), an 18th-century short story by Johann Karl August Musäus
 Richardis (ca. 840–896), Holy Roman Empress